San José de las Matas, also known as Sajoma, is an important municipality (municipio) of the Santiago province in the Dominican Republic. The mayor of Sajoma is Alfredo Reyes. there has been many positive changes in the last four years such as adding a 911 system. Within the municipality there are three municipal districts (distritos municipal): El Rubio, La Cuesta and Las Placetas.

Climate 

San José de Las Matas has a tropical monsoon climate (Köppen climate classification: Am) with two short, dry seasons and two heavy monsoons during most of the year.

Overview 

San José de Las Matas, also known as "Sajoma", in the province of Santiago, is one of the fastest growing municipalities in Ecotourism.

The progress exhibited by this town is the result of a 10-year development plan that emerged in 2010

San José de Las Matas is Located in an area of 1,506 square kilometers. It borders San Juan de la Maguana, Santiago Rodríguez, Jánico and Santiago.

Thousands visit the town every month, where they receive the fresh breeze from the central mountain range and the human warmth of its inhabitants.

Parks 

Ariel Díaz, Administrator of the three tourist parks: Aguas Calientes, El Temático Arroyo Hondo and Parque Acuático la Ventana. The first river depends on the Bao River and is known for its sulfur and other mineral content, where hundreds of people go for its healing properties for the skin.

This is the preferred place for its hot waters spilled from a stone, in the middle of the tributary river.

In Arroyo Hondo is the first hydroelectric plant in the country, built by Rafael Leonidas Trujillo. It is composed of children's areas, Swimming pool, as well as extreme sports in the air.

On the Ámina river, the La Ventana spa is one of the most iconic rivers in the area due to its perforated rock that gives it the appearance of a window, in the community of Inoa, with its crystalline waters clean naturally preserve free of contamination.

Hundreds of people come to tourist parks come from different parts of the country, including Higüey, Barahona, Santiago, Santo Domingo, San Cristóbal, La Vega, and it is increasing.

Apart from the three main parks, there are others parks such as The Milagrosa Chapel, Mirador el Fuerte Parks, the entrance sign to the municipality, La Empanada de Leonora, as well as Club Hacienda Campo Verde.

This last one has a river, Pool, Restaurant and other attractions, And the Casabe Fair, Where for three days more than five thousand people attend. The event is repeated every year.

Notes

References

Populated places in Santiago Province (Dominican Republic)
Municipalities of the Dominican Republic